The 2013–14 Russian National Football League was the 22nd season of Russia's second-tier football league since the dissolution of the Soviet Union. The season began on 7 July 2013 and ended on 11 May 2014.

Teams

League table

Results

Statistics

Top goalscorers
Source: 1fnl.ru 
19 goals
Aleksandr Kutyin (Arsenal)
14 goals
Dmitri Golubov (Ufa)
11 goals
Aleksei Ivanov (Mordovia)
10 goals
Anton Bobyor (Mordovia)
9 goals
Yevgeny Savin (Arsenal)

Events
During winter break 2013-2014, Salyut experienced huge financial difficulties. Almost all contracts with first-team players were terminated by mutual consent. As a result, on 14 February 2014 club officially withdrew from competition in Russian National Football League.

References

External links
Official website

2
Russian First League seasons
Rus